Adam Flowers is an American lyric tenor who is based in San Francisco, California. Flowers sings major lyric tenor roles in opera houses across the western United States.

Flowers was in the resident company of Opera San José from 2001 until 2006 and appeared there in 22 productions, in many leading roles.

Performances
 Symphony No. 9 (Beethoven) – tenor soloist, Winchester Orchestra conducted by Henry Mollicone
 Roméo et Juliette – Tybalt, Hawaii Opera Theatre
 La bohème – Rodolfo, Opera Idaho
 Così fan tutte – Ferrando, Rimrock Opera
For West Bay Opera
 The Merry Widow – Camille de Rosillon
 Pikovaya Dama – Gherman
 Macbeth – Macduff
 The Pilgrim's Progress by Ralph Vaughan Williams – Interpreter/Lord Lechery/Mr. By-Ends, Trinity Lyric Opera
For Opera San José
 Don Giovanni – Don Ottavio
 La bohème – Rodolfo
 Un ballo in maschera – Riccardo
 The Crucible – Danforth
 Der fliegende Holländer – Erik
 Carmen – Don José
 Tosca – Cavaradossi
 Die Fledermaus – Eisenstein
 Les pêcheurs de perles – Nadir
 Cavalleria rusticana – Turiddu
 Die Zauberflöte – Tamino
 Il trovatore – Manrico
 Faust – Faust
 Madama Butterfly – Pinkerton
 Manon – Des Grieux
 Così fan tutte – Ferrando
 Falstaff – Fenton
 L'elisir d'amore – Nemorino

References

External links
 Adam Flowers' Website
 Adam Flowers, tenor Opera San Jose
 Adam Flowers, West Bay Opera]
 Adam Flowers bio, Nova Center for the Performing Arts

American operatic tenors
Year of birth missing (living people)
Living people